Vennalodai is a village in the Thanjavur taluk of Thanjavur district, Tamil Nadu, India.

Demographics 

As per the 2001 census, Vennalodai had a total population of 454 with 227 males and 227 females. The sex ratio was 1000. The literacy rate was 55.82.

References 

 

Villages in Thanjavur district